Damir Hadžić may refer to:

 Damir Hadžić (footballer, born 1978), Bosnian-Herzegovinian footballer
 Damir Hadžić (footballer, born 1984), Slovenian footballer